Brlog is a small settlement in the Gorjanci Hills in the Municipality of Krško in eastern Slovenia. The area is part of the traditional region of Lower Carniola. It is now included in the Lower Sava Statistical Region.

In 1973 a flash flood uncovered the entrance to Levak Cave. Speleologists found a human skull and other small artefacts. In 1975 the cave was excavated to reveal prehistoric Bronze Age and Roman occupation levels.

References

External links
Brlog on Geopedia

Populated places in the Municipality of Krško